The 2012 ICC Women's World Twenty20 was the third ICC Women's World Twenty20 competition, held in Sri Lanka from 26 September to 7 October 2012. The group stage matches were played at the Galle International Stadium in Galle and semi-finals and final were played at R. Premadasa Stadium in Colombo. The competition was held simultaneously with the equivalent men's tournament, the 2012 ICC World Twenty20.

The eventual victors were the 2010 champions Australia, who beat pre-tournament favourites England by four runs in the final, a match which came down to the final ball. England captain Charlotte Edwards blamed this defeat on a "lack of discipline" in her side, whilst Test Match Special analyst Ebony Rainford-Brent cited underachieving bowlers and England's inability to rotate the strike.

With a total of 172 runs at an average of 43.00, Edwards was named Player of the Tournament.

Format
Following warm-up matches, the eight teams were divided into two groups where matches were played in a round-robin format. The two best placed teams from each group progressed to the two-round knock-out stage, whilst the eliminated teams played each other for qualification for the 2014 tournament.

Venues
All matches were played at the following two grounds:

Fixtures and results
All times given are Sri Lanka Standard Time (UTC+05:30)

Warm-up matches
4 warm-up matches were played on 23 and 24 September featuring all 8 teams.

Group stage

Group A

Group B

Knockout stage

Play-offs

Semi-finals

Final

Statistics
Source: ESPNCricinfo

Highest Individual Scores

Most Runs

Most Sixes

Most Fifties

Best Bowling in an Innings

Most Wickets

See also
 2012 ICC World Twenty20

References

External links
 ICC Women's World Twenty20 2012 from Cricinfo
 ICC Women's World Twenty20 statistics page from Cricinfo

 
International cricket competitions in 2012
2012 in Sri Lankan cricket
International women's cricket competitions in Sri Lanka
September 2012 sports events in Asia
October 2012 sports events in Asia
2012 in women's cricket